Fadila Khattabi (born 23 February 1962) is a French politician of La République En Marche! (LREM) who has been serving as a member of the French National Assembly since the 2017 elections, representing Côte-d'Or.

Early life
Khattabi was born in Montbéliard and is the daughter of Algerian immigrants. She studied English in Dijon and later became an English teacher.

Political career

Career in local politics
Khattabi was elected to the Burgundy Regional Council in 2004 and was re-elected in 2010.

Khattabi stepped down from politics in 2015 during the regional elections, after trying to mount a dissident socialist list associated with the MoDem.

Member of the National Assembly, 2017–present
On 24 May 2017 Khattabi launched her campaign for the National Assembly for La République En Marche! She came first in the first round of the ballot, with 32% of the vote. She won the second round with 65.32% of the vote, defeating her National Front opponent Jean-François Bathelier. She was elected to the French National Assembly on 18 June 2017. She was re-elected in the 2022 French legislative election.

In the National Assembly, Khattabi sits on the Committee on Social Affairs, which she has chaired since 2020. She is a President of France-Algeria Friendship Group.

See also
 2017 French legislative election

References

1962 births
Living people
Deputies of the 15th National Assembly of the French Fifth Republic
La République En Marche! politicians
21st-century French women politicians
People from Montbéliard
Women members of the National Assembly (France)
French people of Algerian descent
Politicians from Bourgogne-Franche-Comté
Deputies of the 16th National Assembly of the French Fifth Republic